Africa Renewal is a magazine published by the United Nations. The magazine was established in 1987. It was formerly published as Africa Recovery/Afrique Relance. The magazine is published on a quarterly basis. It focuses on the critical economic, political and social situation in Africa. Africa Renewal (print and online) highlights the efforts made by Africa and the international community to promote the economic recovery and sustainable development of the region in pursuit of the goals of the new partnership for Africa's development (NEPAD) and the achievement of the Millennium Development Goals (MDGs).

The magazine's stories are usually about climate change, food security, conflict resolution efforts, gender equality and women's empowerment, youth, etc. Its focus and writing style enables it to leverage the increasing reader interest in stories about Africa that are not in the mainstream media.

References

External links
 Africa Renewal Online
 Electronic Journals Library (EZB)
 AtoZ electronic journals focused on Africa (NAI)

African-American magazines
English-language magazines
French-language magazines
Magazines established in 1987
Magazines published in New York City
Political magazines published in the United States
Quarterly magazines published in the United States